Yarra was a railway station on the Main South railway line in New South Wales, Australia. It opened in 1875 initially as Collector and closed to passenger services in the 1970s. It was later completely demolished and no trace of the station now survives. East of the station is Joppa Junction, the junction of the Main South line and the Bombala line, which branches at Queanbeyan for Canberra.

References

Disused regional railway stations in New South Wales
Railway stations in Australia opened in 1875
Main Southern railway line, New South Wales